strange haircuts // cardboard guitars // and computer samples is a greatest hits album by the synthpop band Information Society.

Track listing
 "Running" - 7:41
 "Walking Away" - 3:58
 "Repetition" - 4:32
 "Lay All Your Love on Me" (Metal Mix) - 6:48
 "What's on Your Mind (Pure Energy)" - 4:33
 "Think" - 3:54
 "How Long" - 4:05
 "Crybaby" - 5:10
 "Peace & Love, Inc." - 5:00
 "Going, Going Gone" - 4:53
 "Strength" - 5:10
 "A Knife and a Fork/Think Tank" (The Massively Parallel Mix) - 7:06
 "Running" (Victor Calderone Remix) - 4:31
 "What's on Your Mind (Pure Energy 2001)" (Junior Vasquez Remix) - 3:46

References

2001 greatest hits albums
Information Society (band) albums
Tommy Boy Records compilation albums